The Cosna River (Lower Tanana: K'osno) is a  tributary of the Tanana River in the central part of the U.S. state of Alaska. It flows northward from the Bitzshtini Mountains into the Tanana west (downstream) of Manley Hot Springs.

In 1899, Lieutenant J. S. Herron attributed the name to the Tanana peoples living in the area. However, a century later linguist William Bright, citing the Koyukon Athabascan Dictionary, attributed the name to the Koyukon words kk' os, schist rock, combined with no', river.

See also
List of rivers of Alaska

References

Rivers of Alaska
Rivers of Yukon–Koyukuk Census Area, Alaska
Rivers of Unorganized Borough, Alaska
Tanana Athabaskans